Cuando los hijos pecan (When Children Sin) also known as Cabaretera (Cabaret Woman) is a 1952 Mexican film. It was directed by Joselito Rodríguez and starring Meche Barba and Silvia Pinal.

Plot 
Don Evaristo (Carlos Orellana), is a widower with two daughters Aurora (Meche Barba) and Tencha (Silvia Pinal). Aurora is a dancer and cabaret star, while Tencha suffers a limp. The assistant of Don Evaristo, Fidel (Jaime Fernández), is in love with Aurora, and suffers the contempt of the frivolous woman who works in the cabaret where she works and ends up involving herself with a gangster. Meanwhile, Tencha secretly loves Fidel. The virtue of Tencha is rewarded in an unexpected way.

Cast 
 Meche Barba ... Aurora
 Silvia Pinal ... Tencha
 Jaime Fernández ... Fidel
 Carlos Orellana ... Don Evaristo
 Rafael Banquells ... Gonzalo
 María Victoria ... Olga
 José Pulido ... Ramón
 Fanny Schiller ... Doña Elena
 Dolores Camarillo	... Felipa
 Fernando Fernández ... Fernando
 Freddy Fernández ... El Pichi

Review 
In this film, the Mexican rumbera Meche Barba shares credit with the young star of the moment, Silvia Pinal, who plays her younger sister in this melodramatic tale. Meche was known for her way of dancing in imaginary scenarios in Mexican cinema. This is the second film that Barba and Pinal shared credit (the first time was in the film The Sin of Laura (1949), one of the Pinal's first movies).

References

External links
 

1952 films
Rumberas films
1950s Spanish-language films
Mexican drama films
1952 drama films
Mexican black-and-white films
1950s Mexican films